The 2022 National Premier Leagues is the tenth season of the Australian National Premier Leagues football competition. The league competition is being played by eight separate state and territory member federations. The divisions are ACT, NSW, Northern NSW, Queensland, South Australia, Tasmania, Victoria and Western Australia.

League tables

ACT

Finals

NSW

Finals

Northern NSW

Finals

Queensland

Finals

South Australia

Finals

Tasmania

Victoria

Finals

Western Australia

Finals

References

External links
 Official website

2022
2022 domestic association football leagues
2022 in Australian soccer